Carl Jularbo, well known as Calle Jularbo and born as Karl Karlsson (6 June 1893, Jularbo, Avesta Municipality, Dalarna County, Sweden - 13 February 1966, Nacka Municipality, Stockholm County, Sweden) was the most famous Swedish accordionist of his time. He had a very distinct personal style, that has played a significant part in forming the Swedish accordion tradition. He was extremely productive, recording 1577 tunes and he won 158 accordion competitions. He maintained a large repertoire without being able to read music. His best known tune is Livet i Finnskogarna (roughly "Life in the Finn forests"), recorded in 1915. This song was the basis for the Les Paul and Mary Ford hit of 1951, "Mockin' Bird Hill".

Jularbo is the name of his birthplace, which he later adopted as his name. Both his parents were of predominantly Romani descent, which was not revealed until after his death.

Literature
Stig Nahlbom (1974), "Jularbo, Carl Oscar", Svenskt biografiskt lexikon, 20:458-9460.

External links
Carl Jularbo museum in English

Swedish accordionists
Swedish Romani people
1893 births
1966 deaths
People from Avesta Municipality
20th-century accordionists